White Eagle is an unincorporated community in Kay County, Oklahoma, United States.

White Eagle was named for the Ponca principal chief, White Eagle (ca. 1840-1914), who led the Ponca to their reservation in Indian Territory. Other names for the town are Ponca, White Eagle Agency, and Whiteagle.

Geography
White Eagle is located in southeastern Kay County, just east of the Salt Fork and approximately one and one quarter miles west-northwest of the confluence of the Salt Fork with the Arkansas River. The community is on U.S. Route 177, five miles south of Ponca City.

Demographics

Politics
White Eagle is the headquarters for the Ponca Tribe of Indians of Oklahoma.

Notable person
Paladine Roye, Ponca painter, 1946-2001

References

Unincorporated communities in Kay County, Oklahoma
Unincorporated communities in Oklahoma
Ponca